The 1st Supreme People's Assembly (SPA) was elected on 25 August 1948 and convened for its first session on 2 September 1948. It was replaced on 18 September 1957 by the 2nd Supreme People's Assembly. It convened for its first meeting on 2–10 1948, which discussed and adopted the constitution of the Democratic People's Republic of Korea.

Meetings

Officers

Chairman

Vice Chairman

Deputies

References

Citations

Bibliography
Books:
  
 

1st Supreme People's Assembly
1948 establishments in North Korea
1957 disestablishments in North Korea